Egahlou (also Ouaddi) is a town located in central Obock Region of Djibouti.

Ecology
Although there is sparse vegetation in the vicinity, there is some history of animal life in the past.

Climate
Egahlou has a hot arid climate (BWh) in Köppen-Geiger system, with the influence of mountain climate.

References

Obock Region
Populated places in Djibouti